Kuala Perlis is the second-largest town in and the main port of Perlis in Malaysia.  It is in extreme northwest Peninsular Malaysia, near the border with Thailand. The older part of town has houses and mosques built on stilts over mangrove swamps.

Tourist attractions
 Kota Kayang Museum

Transportation

Kuala Perlis has several public transport option. There is taxi service available at the town area. The local community bus service, MyBAS is also available with one route going to Kangar, Perlis.

Land

 Kuala Perlis Bus Terminal

Sea

 Kuala Perlis Ferry Terminal

See also
 List of cities in Malaysia

External links

Tourism Malaysia - Kuala Perlis

Towns in Perlis
Mukims of Perlis